Acartus is a genus of beetles of the tribe Acanthocinini of the subfamily Lamiinae, in the family Cerambycidae, containing the following species:

 Acartus abyssinicus Breuning, 1955
 Acartus biplagiatus (Aurivillius, 1926)
 Acartus bituberosus Breuning, 1959
 Acartus hirtus Fahroeus, 1872
 Acartus penicillatus (Aurivillius, 1907)
 Acartus rufus Breuning, 1964
 Acartus subinermis Lepesme & Breuning, 1957

References

 
Cerambycidae genera
Acanthocinini